Myriopteris alabamensis, the Alabama lip fern, is a moderately-sized fern of the United States and Mexico, a member of the family Pteridaceae. Unlike many members of its genus, its leaves have a few hairs on upper and lower surfaces, or lack them entirely. One of the cheilanthoid ferns, it was usually classified in the genus Cheilanthes as Cheilanthes alabamensis until 2013, when the genus Myriopteris was again recognized as separate from Cheilanthes. It typically grows in shade on limestone outcrops.

Description
The rhizome bears persistent scales, which are linear to narrowly lanceolate, distantly toothed, straight or slightly twisted, and loosely appressed (pressed against the surface of the rhizome). The scales may be uniformly brown or orange-brown in color, or bear a brown central stripe at the base that fades to a pale orange-brown on the rest of the scale.

The fronds spring up in clusters; they do not unfold as fiddleheads like typical ferns (noncircinate vernation). It is black in color, with a covering of long, straight, matted whitish or yellowish hairs, and the upper surface is rounded.

The leaf blades range in shape from lanceolate to linear-oblong. The blade is usually bipinnate (cut into pinnae and pinnules) to bipinnate-pinnatifid (cut into pinnae and lobed pinnules) at the base. The rachis (leaf axis) is rounded on the upper side and dark in color. It bears twisted hairs tightly pressed to it on the upper side, and scattered, spreading, straight hairs on the lower side; no scales are present. The pinnae are not jointed at the base, and the dark pigmentation of the rachis enters the edge of the pinnae. The pinnae at the base of the leaf are slightly smaller than the pinnae immediately above them, and the pinnae are more or less symmetric about the costa (pinna axis). The upper surfaces of the pinnae have a few soft hairs, or none at all. The upper sides of the costae are green for most of their length and lack scales beneath. The pinnules are elliptical to long-triangular, and not bead-shaped as in some other species of Myriopteris.

On fertile fronds, the sori are protected by false indusia formed by the edge of the leaf curling back over the underside. The false indusia are somewhat differentiated in appearance and texture from the rest of the leaf tissue, and are 0.1 to 0.4 mm wide. Beneath them, the sori are generally continuous around the edges of the fertile pinnules. Each sporangium in a sorus carries 32 spores. Most individual sporophytes are apogamous triploids, with a chromosome number of 3n = 87. Sexual diploids with 2n = 58 are known from Nuevo Leon, Mexico.

Taxonomy
The common name "lip fern" comes from the position of the sporangia at the edge or lip of the leaf, typical of the genus. The species was first described in 1843 by Samuel Botsford Buckley, based on material collected from limestone rocks on the banks of the Tennessee River at the foot of Muscle Shoals, Alabama. He named it Pteris alabamensis, for the location where it was collected, also giving rise to the common name.

In 1847, Gustav Kunze (who had grown the plant from spore, provided by Ferdinand Rugel) transferred the species to the genus Cheilanthes as C. alabamensis. William Jackson Hooker & John Gilbert Baker, in their second edition of Synopsis Filicum (1874), separated the genera Cheilanthes and Pellaea based on the character of the false indusium, placing species with a continuous indusium into Pellaea; accordingly, Baker renamed the species Pellaea alabamensis. However, American manuals did not generally follow this rather artificial distinction; the Illustrated Flora of Britton and Brown (1896) and the 7th edition of Gray's Manual (1908) both refer to it as C. alabamensis, the name under which the species was generally known during the 20th Century. Nor did they generally accept George Edward Davenport's 1894 demotion of the species to a variety of the very similar Cheilanthes microphylla as C. microphylla var. alabamensis.

As part of his wide-ranging program of taxonomic revision, Otto Kuntze argued that the principle of priority precluded the use of the generic name Pellaea, and transferred the species to the older genus Allosorus in 1891. This combination was rendered unnecessary when Pellaea and Cheilanthes were conserved over Allosorus in the Paris Code published in 1956.

The development of molecular phylogenetic methods showed that the traditional circumscription of Cheilanthes is polyphyletic. Convergent evolution in arid environments is thought to be responsible for widespread homoplasy in the morphological characters traditionally used to classify it and the segregate genera that have sometimes been recognized. On the basis of molecular evidence, Amanda Grusz and Michael D. Windham revived the genus Myriopteris in 2013 for a group of species formerly placed in Cheilanthes. One of these was C. alabamensis, which thus became Myriopteris alabamensis.

In 2018, Maarten J. M. Christenhusz transferred the species to Hemionitis as H. alabamensis, as part of a program to consolidate the cheilanthoid ferns into that genus.

Further molecular studies in Myriopteris demonstrated the existence of three well-supported clades within the genus. M. alabamensis is deeply nested in one of them, informally named the alabamensis clade by  Grusz et al.

Distribution and habitat
Within the United States, M. alabamensis is found in the southern Appalachian Mountains from Virginia and North Carolina south, in the Ozarks, along the southern border of Arizona, New Mexico and Texas, and in a few isolated stations in the Mississippi Valley and on the east coast of Florida. In Mexico, it is present in the northern states bordering the United States (except Baja California) and south through central Mexico to Oaxaca.

Myriopteris alabamensis typically grows on limestone cliffs and ledges, or on the ground on shell mounds or among limestone rocks. It prefers shady habitat.

Ecology and conservation
While globally secure (G4G5), M. alabamensis is threatened in many states in the northern and eastern part of its range. It has become extinct in Louisiana, and is only known historically from Kentucky. NatureServe considers it to be critically imperiled in Kansas, Mississippi, Missouri, North Carolina, Oklahoma, and Virginia, imperiled in Georgia, and vulnerable in Alabama.

Cultivation
Myriopteris alabamensis can be cultivated, and should be grown under medium-high light in alkaline garden soil and sand. The soil should be dry to slightly moist.

Notes and references

References

Works cited

External links

alabamensis
Ferns of Mexico
Ferns of the United States
Flora of the Eastern United States
Plants described in 1843